Enno Cheng is a Taiwanese indie singer-songwriter who is also an author and a film actress.  She is currently part of the band Chocolate Tiger (猛虎巧克力) in addition to performing and releasing albums solo.  She is the daughter of film director Cheng Wen-tang, who she often collaborates with by writing screenplays and film scores as well as performing in his films.

Career 

She attended Tamkang University and majored in Chinese, but took a leave of absence in 2007.

She first appeared in the film industry in 2007 in the film Summer's Tail, where she portrayed the main character Yvette Chang.  She also composed and wrote for the film.  Her performance was praised in The Hollywood Reporter although the film itself was panned. She was also nominated for the Best New Performer award at the 44th Golden Horse Awards for her role. She was cast as Wen, a betel nut beauty, in the 2009 film Tears.

Her debut album "Neptune" (海王星) was released by White Wabbit Records in July 2011.

She performed on 30 August 2019 in Kuala Lumpur as part of an official musical exchange spearheaded by Taiwan's Ministry of Culture between Taiwan and Malaysia, along with math rock band Elephant Gym, Formosan aboriginal singer Chalaw Passiwali, and Malaysian band Pastel Lite. She was slated to perform at SXSW 2020, but the event was cancelled due to the outbreak of COVID-19 pandemic in the United States.

Personal life 

Cheng married to Sam Yang, the lead singer for band Fire EX. in 2013.  They amicably divorced in 2016, at which time she announced that she was gay.

Activism and politics 

In 2009, Cheng posed for photographer Clive Arrowsmith as part of the "T for Tibet" campaign, in which celebrities were photographed forming the letter "T" with their hands, along with other Taiwanese musicians Fire EX., Panai Kusui, and Chthonic.

Due to the COVID-19 pandemic, Cheng gave a performance remotely for the inauguration of President Tsai Ing-wen's second term.

In May 2020, Cheng recorded a track for the album T-POP: No Fear In Love, a compilation album celebrating the one-year anniversary of the legalization of same-sex marriage in Taiwan, with others including 9m88.

Filmography

Films 
 Summer's Tail 夏天的尾巴 (2007)
 Tears 眼淚 (2009)
 Maverick (2015)

Television 
 ''Green Door (2019)
 The Mirror (2019)

Discography

Solo albums 

 Neptune (2011)
 Pluto (2017)
 Dear Uranus (2019)
 2021 完人線上Tour 演唱會Live (2021)
 Mercury Retrograde (2022)

with Chocolate Tiger 

 Nighttime Factory (夜工廠) (2013)
 YI-CHUN (怡君) (2015)

Bibliography
 Summer's Tail (2007)

References

External links

 
 
 
 

1987 births
Living people
Taiwanese film actresses
Taiwanese women singer-songwriters
People from Yilan County, Taiwan
Taiwanese lesbian actresses
Taiwanese lesbian musicians
Taiwanese LGBT singers
Taiwanese LGBT songwriters
Lesbian singers
Lesbian songwriters
21st-century Taiwanese women singers
21st-century Taiwanese LGBT people